Luis Amaranto Perea Mosquera (born 30 January 1979) is a Colombian former footballer, and a current manager. Gifted with incredible stamina and pace, the central defender could also be adapted at right back.

He spent most of his senior career with Atlético Madrid, appearing in 314 competitive matches over eight La Liga seasons. In 2012, he signed with Cruz Azul.

Perea earned 72 caps for the Colombia national team, in more than one decade.

Club career
Perea was born in Turbo. He began his professional career with Independiente Medellín, moving in 2003 to Argentina with Boca Juniors, with whom he won that year's Intercontinental Cup.

In June 2004, Perea signed for Atlético Madrid on a four-year deal, as another centre-back, Pablo Ibáñez, also arrived that season. Both were the starters as the Colchoneros returned to the UEFA Champions League in 2008–09 after a 12-year absence, with Perea appearing in 30 La Liga matches; after the campaign kicked off, he received his Spanish passport.

After the signing of ACF Fiorentina's Tomáš Ujfaluši for the 2008–09, Perea saw some additional time as a right back, but eventually lost that place to another newly signed, John Heitinga. From 2009 to 2011, with the latter departed to Everton, he managed to play a total of 56 league games, with qualification to the UEFA Europa League in his second season after a seventh-place finish.

On 29 September 2011, following a Europa League match against Stade Rennais FC, Perea became the foreign player with most competitive appearances for Atlético Madrid with 289, surpassing Argentine Jorge Griffa. He left the club at the end of the 2011–12 campaign at the age of 33, after having contributed 34 official matches and won the Europa League.

Perea joined Mexico's Cruz Azul in June 2012 as a free agent, winning the following year's Copa MX and the 2013–14 CONCACAF Champions League. In December 2015, after one year out of football due to injury, the 36-year-old chose to retire, settling in Madrid and focusing on becoming a coach.

In late August 2018, following a brief spell in Atlético's youth academy, Perea was appointed at Leones F.C. in his country's Categoría Primera A for his first head coach experience. on 28 May 2019, with the team back in the Primera B after relegation, he resigned.

International career
A Colombian international since 20 November 2002, in a 0–1 friendly loss with Honduras played in San Pedro Sula, Perea appeared at the 2007 and 2011 Copa América tournaments. He was named team captain before the 2014 FIFA World Cup qualification match against Bolivia in La Paz, in a first-ever win in that country (2–1), and represented his nation for nearly 12 years.

Honours
Independiente Medellín
Categoría Primera A: 2002-II

Boca Juniors
Argentine Primera División: 2003–04
Intercontinental Cup: 2003

Atlético Madrid
UEFA Europa League: 2009–10, 2011–12
UEFA Super Cup: 2010
UEFA Intertoto Cup: 2007
Copa del Rey runner-up: 2009–10

Cruz Azul
Copa MX: Clausura 2013
CONCACAF Champions League: 2013–14

References

External links
 
 
 
 
 

1979 births
Living people
Sportspeople from Antioquia Department
Colombian emigrants to Spain
Naturalised citizens of Spain
Colombian footballers
Association football defenders
Categoría Primera A players
Independiente Medellín footballers
Argentine Primera División players
Boca Juniors footballers
La Liga players
Atlético Madrid footballers
Liga MX players
Cruz Azul footballers
UEFA Europa League winning players
Colombia international footballers
2003 CONCACAF Gold Cup players
2007 Copa América players
2011 Copa América players
Colombian expatriate footballers
Expatriate footballers in Argentina
Expatriate footballers in Spain
Expatriate footballers in Mexico
Colombian expatriate sportspeople in Argentina
Colombian expatriate sportspeople in Spain
Colombian expatriate sportspeople in Mexico
Colombian football managers
Atlético Junior managers